A mitten is a type of glove that covers the hand but does not have separate finger openings or sheaths. Generally, mittens still separate the thumb from the other four fingers. They have different colours and designs.  Mittens provide greater thermal insulation than gloves as they have a smaller surface area exposed to the cold, but have a trade-off in dexterity.

Mittens are associated with cold weather, children's clothing, comfort and various occupational uses. In the English-speaking world, they also have a cultural association with domestic cats, as in the Three Little Kittens.

Mittens are a common sight on ski slopes, as they not only provide extra warmth but extra protection from injury. They are also recommended as part of extreme cold weather clothing. Oven mitts are worn in the kitchen to protect the hands from hot objects.

History 
Humans have likely used mittens for millennia, but wool and other materials used to construct clothing biodegrade quickly, which limits the amount of extant relics. From Ancient Egypt several depictions of mittens survive, and some gloves found at Egyptian pyramids have been described as resembling mittens, with the collection of egyptologist Robert Hay supposedly having contained a "linen sleeve and mitten in one piece."

Some of the earliest clearly identifiable mittens date to around 1000 A.D. in Latvia, and mittens continue to be part of Latvian national costume today. Another example is a specimen found during the excavations of the Early Medieval trading town of Dorestad in the Netherlands: In the harbour area a mitten of wool was discovered dating from the 8th or early 9th century.
Two left-handed leather mittens found on the Mary Rose are believed to have been used for falconry, whereas in modern times gloves or gauntlets are used for this purpose. From Elizabethan times, embroidered "gauntlet mittens" survive which were made from crimson silk velvet, satin and  sequins, with the thread and floss dyed in twelve different colours.

When knitting became more popular in England in the 16th century, mittens were produced at home from wool. One of the earliest known mittens for children survives from this period. The is a form of circular knitting, and modern knitters often use a circular needle.

Many people around the Arctic Circle have used mittens, including other Baltic peoples, Native Americans and Vikings.

Types 

Mittens are made from several materials, including wool, leather and fur. From the late 18th century, knitting patterns were published which allowed to inscribe poems on knitted mittens.

Special types of mittens include:

Hunter's mittens – In the 1930s, special woolen mittens were introduced that had a flap located in the palm of the mitten so a hunter could have his finger free to fire his weapon.

Scratch mitts do not separate the thumb, and are designed to prevent babieswho do not yet have fine motor controlfrom scratching their faces. However, they are usually not recommended anymore as they can prevent the newborn's natural behaviour of sucking on its hand and gaining tactile experience.

Corded mittens are two mittens connected by a length of yarn, string or lace, threaded through the sleeves of a coat. This arrangement is typically provided for small children to prevent the mittens becoming discarded and lost; when removed, the mittens simply dangle from the string just beyond the cuff of the sleeve.

In popular culture 
The West and East Mitten Buttes, two rock formations in Monument Valley, Arizona, are popularly known as 'The Mittens' because when viewed from the south, the buttes appear to be two giant mittens with their thumbs facing inwards. The Lower Peninsula of Michigan is nicknamed "The Mitten" due to its cartographic shape, and includes The Thumb.

The Mitten is a popular Ukrainian folktale that has been translated into other languages.

"Mittens" is a Christmas song by Carly Rae Jepsen that reached number 26 on the Canadian Adult Contemporary chart in 2010.

During the inauguration of Joe Biden on January 20, 2021, a photograph of Vermont senator and former presidential candidate Bernie Sanders was taken by Agence France-Presse photographer Brendan Smialowski, depicting a masked Sanders sitting on a folding chair wearing winter clothing, most noticeably a large, fluffy pair of mittens, which were made by Vermont elementary school teacher Jen Ellis. The photograph became a popular internet meme.

Domestic cats  
A nursery rhyme "Three Little Kittens", attributed to Mother Goose, narrates a woeful tale of childhood mitten loss through the fanciful title characters:

The three little kittens, they lost their mittens,And they began to cry,"Oh, mother dear, we sadly fear,That we have lost our mittens.""What! Lost your mittens, you naughty kittens!Then you shall have no pie."

In the English-speaking world "Mittens" is a popular name for a cat – whether because of the nursery rhyme, or because some cats' fur patterns create contrasting colours on their feet, creating the impression they are 'wearing mittens'. In the 1907 children's book The Tale of Tom Kitten by Beatrix Potter, the title character has a sister named Mittens.

The 1959 Rodgers and Hammerstein song "My Favorite Things", from the musical The Sound of Music, includes the lyrics: "Raindrops on roses and whiskers on kittens/Bright copper kettles and warm woolen mittens".

Mittens is a domestic cat in Wellington, New Zealand, who wanders the city's central business district and is fondly regarded by locals and tourists. 

In the 2008 Disney animated film Bolt, Mittens (voiced by Susie Essman) is a feral cat who helps the title character, a white shepherd dog voiced by John Travolta, find his way home.

Gallery

See also 
 Glove
 Muff (handwarmer)

References 

Protective gear
Gloves
Winter clothes